Homeobox protein DLX-4 is a protein that in humans is encoded by the DLX4 gene.

Function 

Many vertebrate homeobox-containing genes have been identified on the basis of their sequence similarity with Drosophila developmental genes. Members of the Dlx gene family contain a homeobox that is related to that of Distal-less (Dll), a gene expressed in the head and limbs of the developing fruit fly. The Distal-less (Dlx) family of genes comprises at least 6 different members, DLX1-DLX6. The DLX proteins are postulated to play a role in forebrain and craniofacial development. Three transcript variants have been described for this gene, however, the full length nature of one variant has not been described. Studies of the two splice variants revealed that one encoded isoform (BP1) functions as a repressor of the beta-globin gene while the other isoform lacks that function.

References

Further reading

External links 
 

Transcription factors